An Honorary Chaplain to the King (KHC) is a member of the clergy within the United Kingdom who, through long and distinguished service, is appointed to minister to the monarch of the United Kingdom. When the reigning monarch is female, Honorary Chaplains are known as Honorary Chaplains to the Queen (QHC).  there are 33 appointees.  They are also known as Honorary Chaplains to the Sovereign.

Honorary Chaplains wear a scarlet cassock and a special bronze badge consisting of the royal cypher and crown within an oval wreath. The badge is worn below medal ribbons or miniature medals during the conduct of religious services on the left side of the scarf by chaplains who wear the scarf and on academic or ordinary clerical dress by other chaplains.

Ten ministers of the Church of Scotland are appointed as Chaplains to the King in Scotland.

The monarch may also, as circumstances dictate, appoint extra chaplains.

Notable chaplains

 Gavin Ashenden, was a QHC from 2008 to 2017; he then resigned from the Church of England in protest and was first made a bishop in the Christian Episcopal Church and then to convert to the Catholic Church
 Rose Hudson-Wilkin, who delivered a prayer at the Wedding of Prince Harry and Meghan Markle and also served as Chaplain to the Speaker of the House of Commons, currently Bishop of Dover
Mary Levison, in 1991 she became first woman to hold the position of QHC in her role as a minister of the Church of Scotland
Marion Mingins, first woman to become an Anglican QHC

See also
 
Ecclesiastical Household
Dean of the Chapel Royal

Notes

 
Positions within the British Royal Household